The Grove Street School is a historic school building at 23 Grove Street in Spencer, Massachusetts.  The -story brick building was built in two phases: in the first phase in 1876, a single story was built.  It was full to overflowing by 1878, and in 1883 the second story was built, designed by Fuller & Delano. It is a T-shaped building, whose main body is a horizontal rectangle, with a projecting central pavilion.  The three roof gable ends are jerkin-headed, and are decorated with bargeboard and heavy brackets.

The building was added to the National Register of Historic Places in 1996, and was included in the 2003 expansion of the Spencer Town Center Historic District.

See also
National Register of Historic Places listings in Worcester County, Massachusetts

References

School buildings on the National Register of Historic Places in Massachusetts
School buildings completed in 1876
Buildings and structures in Worcester County, Massachusetts
Spencer, Massachusetts
National Register of Historic Places in Worcester County, Massachusetts
Historic district contributing properties in Massachusetts